Sir George Abercrombie Robinson, 1st Baronet (29March 175813February 1832) was a British MP and Chairman of the East India Company.

He was born the son of John Robinson of Calcutta, who died at the Cape of Good Hope in 1779, and Margaret, daughter of George Leslie of Kimrawgie, North Britain. He joined the East India Company in 1779 as a cadet and was successively promoted to ensign, Commissary-General (1786), Aide-de-Camp to Lord Cornwallis (Governor-General of Bengal) (1788), Head Assistant in the Military Auditor-General's office (1788–92), Garrison Storekeeper at Fort William and Secretary to the Military Board, captain (1798) and Military Auditor-General (1798). He retired in 1802 and served as Private Secretary to Cornwallis from July to October, 1805.

He became a director of the East India Company from 1808 to 1829, acting as chairman in 1820 and 1826 . and was also a director of the Globe Insurance Company. He was elected as the MP for Honiton in 1812 (until 1818).

He was created the first Baronet of Batts House, Somerset on 11 November 1823. The title would become extinct in 1944 on the death of Sir Douglas Robinson, 6th Baronet.

On 27March 1794 he married, in Calcutta, Margaret Southwell, the natural daughter of Thomas Howard, 14th Earl of Suffolk, with whom he had seven sons and a daughter: 
George-Best – died young
Francis-Matilda – died young
Sir George Best Robinson, 2nd Baronet – became the second chief superintendent of British trade in China in 1835.
Francis-Horsley
The Revd William-Scott Robinson, Rector of Dyrham, Gloucestershire
Charles-Cornwallis – died young
Henry-Sterling
Edward Innes

He died on 13February 1832 at his son William-Scotts house in Dyrham after a long illness. Margaret predeceased him on 21May 1824.

References

 

1758 births
1832 deaths
British East India Company
Directors of the British East India Company
British East India Company people
British Indian history
Members of the Parliament of the United Kingdom for Honiton
UK MPs 1812–1818
Baronets in the Baronetage of the United Kingdom